Oak Grove Cemetery is the oldest cemetery of the city of Conway, Arkansas.  It was established in 1880, five years after the town was incorporated and nine after its first settlement.  The cemetery is in active use, with more than 3,000 burials.  Among the interred are many of the city's earliest and most prominent citizens.

See also
 National Register of Historic Places listings in Faulkner County, Arkansas

References

External links
 

Cemeteries on the National Register of Historic Places in Arkansas
Buildings and structures completed in 1881
Buildings and structures in Conway, Arkansas
1881 establishments in Arkansas
Cemeteries established in the 1880s